India–Myanmar relations, also knows as Indian–Burmese relations or Indian–Myanmar relations, are the bilateral relations between the Republic of India and the Republic of the Union of Myanmar. These relations encompass the political, economic and socio-cultural relations that exist between the two neighboring Asian countries. Political relations have improved considerably since 1993, overcoming tensions related to drug trafficking, the suppression of democracy and the rule of the military junta in Myanmar. Political leaders from both countries meet regularly on a bilateral basis and within the ASEAN Plus Six community. Economic relations are considerable with India representing Myanmar's 4th largest export market and the country's 5th largest import partner.

The  India–Myanmar border separates the Indian states of Mizoram, Manipur, Nagaland and Arunachal Pradesh in Northeast India from Kachin State, Sagaing Region and Chin State in Myanmar/Burma. In addition to the long land border, India and Myanmar also share a maritime border along India's Andaman Islands.

History 

India–Myanmar/Burmese relations date to antiquity and cultural exchanges included Buddhism and the Burmese script, which was based on the Indian Grantha script. In particular, Theravada Buddhism has tremendously influenced Burmese society and culture for millennia, with around 90% of Burma's population continuing to follow the religion.

Myanmar (formerly Burma) was made a province of British India by British rulers and again separated in 1937. It was in Japanese-occupied Burma that Indian nationalist Subhas Chandra Bose delivered his "Give me blood and I will give you freedom!" slogan, and Prime Minister Narendra Modi highlighted Burma's role in the Indian independence movement.

India established diplomatic relations after Myanmar's independence from Britain in 1948. For many years, Indo-Burmese relations were strong due to Myanmar previously having been a province of India, due to cultural links, flourishing commerce, common interests in regional affairs and the presence of a significant Indian community in Myanmar. India provided considerable support when Myanmar struggled with regional insurgencies. However, the overthrow of the democratic government by the Military of Myanmar led to strains in ties. Along with much of the world, India condemned the suppression of democracy and Myanmar ordered the expulsion of the Burmese Indian community, increasing its own isolation from the world. Only China maintained close links with Myanmar while India supported the pro-democracy movement.

A major breakthrough occurred in 1987 when the then-Indian Prime Minister Rajiv Gandhi visited Myanmar, but relations worsened after the military junta's reaction towards pro-democracy movements in 1988, which resulted in an influx of Burmese refugees into India. However, since 1993 the governments of the Indian Prime Ministers P. V. Narasimha Rao and Atal Bihari Vajpayee changed course and began to establish warmer relations between the two nations, as part of a wider foreign policy of increasing India's participation and influence in Southeast Asia, in light of the growing influence of the People's Republic of China, an India-Myanmar joint operation destroyed several militant camps of Arakan Army on the Indo-Myanmar border.
The action averted a possible threat to the ambitious Kaladan transit and transport project which is important for improving the connectivity in the Northeast.
Myanmar is important for India because of the geographic, historical, cultural and economic linkages/ties that span centuries as well as for the overall development of North-Eastern Indian states. India and Myanmar relationship officially got underway after the Treaty of Friendship was signed in 1951..

Economic relations
India is Burma's 4th largest trading partner after Thailand, China and Singapore, and second largest export market after Thailand, absorbing 25 percent of its total exports. India is also the seventh most important source of Burma's imports. The governments of India and Myanmar had set a target of achieving $1 billion and bilateral trade reached US$1.3 billion by 2017. The Indian government has worked to extend air, land and sea routes to strengthen trade links with Myanmar and establish a gas pipeline. While the involvement of India's private sector has been low and growing at a slow pace, both governments are proceeding to enhance cooperation in agriculture, telecommunications, information technology, steel, oil, natural gas, hydrocarbons and food processing. The bilateral border trade agreement of 1994 provides for border trade to be carried out from three designated border points, one each in Manipur, Mizoram and Nagaland.

Infrastructure initiatives 
On 13 February 2001 India and Myanmar inaugurated 250 kilometre Tamu-Kalewa-Kalemyo highway, popularly called the Indo-Myanmar Friendship Road, built mainly by the Indian Army's Border Roads Organisation and aimed to provide a major strategic and commercial transport route connecting North-East India, and South Asia as a whole, to Southeast Asia.

India-Myanmar-Thailand Friendship Highway

India and Myanmar have agreed to a 4-lane, 3200 km triangular highway connecting India, Myanmar and Thailand. The route, which is expected to have completed during 2016, runs from India's northeastern states into Myanmar, where over 1,600 km of roads were built or improved.

The route begins from Guwahati in India and connects to Mandalay in Myanmar, route continues to Yangon in Myanmar and then to Mae Sot in Thailand, which then continues to Bangkok.

India is undertaking two sections of the Trilateral Highway namely, (i) construction of Kalewa-Yagyi road section in Myanmar, and (ii) construction of 69 bridges on the Tamu-Kyigone-Kalewa (TKK) road section in Myanmar. The work on both these sections has been awarded on Engineering, Procurement and Construction mode and is underway since May 2018 for Kalewa-Yagyi section and November 2017 for the TKK section.

The first phase connecting Guwahati to Mandalay will eventually be extended to Cambodia and Vietnam under Mekong-Ganga Cooperation within the wider framework of Asian Highway Network. This is aimed at creating a new economic zone ranging from Kolkata on the Bay of Bengal to Ho Chi Minh City on the South China Sea.

Kaladan Multi-modal Transit Route
The Kaladan Multi-Modal Transit Transport Project will connect the eastern Indian seaport of Kolkata with Sittwe seaport in Myanmar by sea; it will then link Sittwe seaport to Lashio in Myanmar via Kaladan river boat route and then from Lashio on to Mizoram in India by road transport. The project was scheduled to be completed by 2014 according to Governor of Mizoram Vakkom Purushothaman., but as of Nov 2014 it is likely to be completed by 2016.

Visas
During a 2017 visit to Nay Pyi Taw, Prime Minister Modi announced that India would offer gratis/no-cost visas to all Myanmar citizens visiting India.

Strategic cooperations

India's move to forge close relations with Myanmar are motivated by a desire to counter China's growing influence as a regional leader and enhance its own influence and standing. Concerns and tensions increased in India over China's extensive military involvement in developing ports, naval and intelligence facilities and industries, specifically the upgrading of a naval base in Sittwe, a major seaport located close to the eastern Indian city of Kolkata. India's engagement of the Burmese military junta has helped ease the regime's international isolation and lessen Burma's reliance on China. Both nations sought to cooperate to counteract drug trafficking and insurgent groups operating in the border areas. India and Myanmar are leading members of BIMSTEC and the Mekong-Ganga Cooperation, along with Vietnam, Laos, Cambodia and Thailand, helping India develop its influence and ties amongst Southeast Asian nations.

In 2013, India provided a loan of about US$500million. to Myanmar for its development; India and Myanmar have also agreed to cooperate militarily in order to help modernize Myanmar's military.

In 2020, India gifted the Myanmar navy its first ever submarine, a kilo class (INS Sindhuvir) attack submarine which has been refurbished and modernised by Hindustan Shipyard Limited.

Security ties
Indian and Myanmar troops carried out jointly Operation Sunrise and Operation Sunrise 2 in 2019 in their respective territories to destroy several insurgent camps. However the threat to the Kaladan multi-modal transit transport project, India's gateway to Southeast Asia continues. In January 2023 operations by the Myanmar Air Force in a sparsely populated area along the border were carried out; proximity of local populations resulted in their disquiet.

India has also supported Myanmar in its efforts to combat Rohingya insurgent groups like the Arakan Rohingya Salvation Army (ARSA) and Aqa Mul Mujahideen (AMM), after Indian intelligence agencies found the ARSA and AMM to have links with terror groups like the Lashkar-e-Taiba (LeT) and Jaish-e-Mohammed (JeM) as well as reported Rohingya terrorists fighting alongside Pakistani extremists in Kashmir.

Disaster relief
India responded promptly and effectively in rendering assistance after natural disaster in Myanmar such as the earthquake in Shan state (2010) Cyclone Mora (2017), and Komen (2015). India offered to help in capacity building in disaster risk mitigation as well as strengthening Myanmar's National Disaster Response Mechanism.

Covid-19 vaccines 
India granted 1.7 million Covid-19 vaccines to Myanmar in the months of January and February of 2021.

Human rights

India was hesitant in reacting to the 2007 Burmese anti-government protests that had drawn overwhelming international condemnation. India also declared that it had no intention of interfering in Burma's internal affairs and that the Burmese people would have to achieve democracy by themselves as it respects the sovereignty of Myanmar. This low-key response has been widely criticised both within India and abroad as weakening India's credentials as a leading democratic nation.

In contrast to much of the international community, Prime Minister Modi declined to criticize Suu Kyi's handling of the 2016–17 Northern Rakhine State clashes or Myanmar's government's treatment of its Rohingya people.

India also announced plans to deport its Rohingya refugee population. Minister of State for Home Affairs Kiren Rijiju described the refugees as "illegal immigrants", echoing the Myanmar government position. Although the Rohingya have fought deportation in the Indian courts (partly on humanitarian grounds), in September 2017 the Indian government responded that India did not sign the 1951 Refugee Convention and most Rohingya arrived in India before the August 2017 violence. Some Indian media have reported that the country's intelligence agencies suspect militant Royhinga leaders of conspiring with Pakistani terrorists and planning to incite violence in India.

See also

 Asian Highway Network
 India-Myanmar-Thailand Friendship Highway
 Foreign relations of Burma
 India–Myanmar barrier
 India–Myanmar border
 Kha Maung Seik massacre
 Arunachal Border Highway

References

Further reading
 
 
Lokesh, Chandra, & International Academy of Indian Culture. (2000). Society and culture of Southeast Asia: Continuities and changes. New Delhi: International Academy of Indian Culture and Aditya Prakashan. 
R. C. Majumdar, Study of Sanskrit in South-East Asia
R. C. Majumdar, Ancient Indian colonisation in South-East Asia.
R. C. Majumdar, Champa, Ancient Indian Colonies in the Far East, Vol.I, Lahore, 1927. 
R. C. Majumdar, Suvarnadvipa, Ancient Indian Colonies in the Far East, Vol.II, Calcutta,
R. C. Majumdar, Kambuja Desa or an Ancient Hindu Colony in Cambodia, Madras, 1944
R. C. Majumdar, India and South-East Asia, I.S.P.Q.S. History and Archaeology Series Vol. 6, 1979, .
R. C. Majumdar, History of the Hindu Colonization and Hindu Culture in South-East Asia
 Amit Singh, "Emerging Trends in India-Myanmar Relations," Maritime Affairs: Journal of the National Maritime Foundation of India, Vol. 8, No. 2, (Dec 2012) Pages: 25-47 DOI:10.1080/09733159.2012.742650

 
Myanmar
Bilateral relations of Myanmar